Everything is an American alternative rock band from Harrisonburg, Virginia, best known for their 1998 hit "Hooch".

History
The band was formed in 1989 by students at James Madison University. Going on the road full-time in '92, they played 200-250 shows a year for nearly the next 10 years, starting in the mid-Atlantic, and then gradually expanding their grass roots fan base until it extended across half of the U.S. The band released its first 3 albums independently, selling almost 30,000 CDs before signing a brief and ill-fated deal with Capricorn Records in 1995.

Larger scale success came when they signed with indie label Blackbird who funded the recording of the Super Natural album, and whose uplift venture with Sire/London eventually provided the radio and distribution muscle that got the breaking single "Hooch" to top radio stations around the world. Their peak of popularity came in 1998, when "Hooch" (from the Super Natural album) was featured in Adam Sandler's movie The Waterboy. From 1998 to 2000, it charted in the top 10 on Billboard's Pop and Hot AC charts, as well as top 20 on the Modern Rock charts. The band reveled in their 'new-found' popularity, playing radio shows and festival crowds around the country. "Hooch" has been heard in episodes of My Name Is Earl, Raising Hope, Yes, Dear, and Clueless, and also was featured on the soundtrack of the first season of the show Scrubs.

Following the AOL/Time Warner merger, and the subsequent dissolution of all joint ventures under the Warner Music Group umbrella, the band was independent once again, and they released People Are Moving in a co-distribution deal with What Are Records in 2001. The band toured internationally in Japan and Korea, before finally deciding to take a hiatus. The band reconvened in 2004 to record the album In the Juju Underworld, which was not released until 2006.

Band members
Richard Bradley (tenor sax, guitar, vocals)
Nate Brown (drums, percussion, vocals)
Craig Honeycutt (guitar, lead vocals)
Mark Reinhardt (keyboards, trumpet, trombone, vocals)
David Slankard (bass)
Stephen Van Dam (guitar, alto sax, clarinet, vocals)
Terence 'Wolfe' Quinn (keyboards, trombone)

Other members
Pete Cordo (Roadie)
Shaw Garrison (Road Manager)
Terry Harrison (Multimedia Light Shows)
Ryan Nichols (Sound)
Randy Reed (Manager)
Jon Bradner (Marketing/Development)
Doug Wannamaker (keyboards)
James Brown (banjo)

Discography

Studio albums
 Play (1991)
 Solid (1992)
 Labrador (1994)

 Super Natural (1998) #173 US
 People Are Moving (2001)
 In the Juju Underworld (2006)

Live albums
 Everything (Live) (1996)

Singles

References

External links
Official website
Everything riding Waterboy wave (The Free Lance–Star July 1, 1999)

Rock music groups from Virginia
Capricorn Records artists